Mehmet Ali Aslan (born 1975 in Silvan, Diyarbakır Province, Turkey) is a Turkish politician of Mhallami descent and the founding chairman of the ethnic group's first organization, the Mhallami Association.

Born in Silvan, Diyarbakır Province, Aslan grew up in Mercimekli in Midyat. Since 2002, he has been working as a sports teacher in Midyat.

Aslan contested the June 2015 general election as a list candidate for the Peoples' Democratic Party (HDP). Placed 4th representing Mardin, Aslan was elected to become the first Mhallami member of the Turkish Parliament. As he committed his oath of office to the "peoples of Turkey" rather than "the Turkish people," he was called out for allegedly having Armenian roots. Aslan however denied "any connection with Armenians. If I had, I would be proud of it."

In the November snap election, he was placed 2nd on the HDP's list in the neighboring Batman province and was subsequently reelected to parliament.

References 

1969 births
Living people
Turkish people of Mhallami descent
Peoples' Democratic Party (Turkey) politicians
Deputies of Mardin
Members of the 25th Parliament of Turkey
Deputies of Batman
Members of the 26th Parliament of Turkey